Alexandros Antoniou (born 3 September 1999) is a Cypriot football who currently plays for Ermis Aradippou as a goalkeeper.

Club statistics

References

External links

1999 births
Living people
Cypriot footballers
Cypriot First Division players
AC Omonia players
Ermis Aradippou FC players
Association football goalkeepers